Chocolate-covered almonds are a confection created by covering almonds with chocolate.

History
In 1742, William Parks printed a copy of Eliza Smith's cookbook, The Compleat Housewife. "Chocolate almonds" was the only chocolate recipe it contained despite the popularity of chocolate among the wealthy at the time.

Many places on the internet claim that July 8 is (American) National Milk Chocolate with Almonds Day, while November 7 is National Chocolate with Bitter Almonds Day.

See also

 List of chocolate-covered foods

References 

Chocolate-covered foods
Almonds